"Can I Count On You" is a song written by Terry McBride, Bill Carter and Ruth Ellsworth, and recorded by American country music group McBride & the Ride.  It was released in March 1991 as the third single from the album Burnin' Up the Road.  The song reached number 15 on the U.S. Billboard Hot Country Singles & Tracks chart and peaked at number 9 on the RPM Country Tracks chart in Canada.

Music video
The music video was directed by Bill Young and premiered in early 1991.

Chart performance

Year-end charts

References

1991 singles
1990 songs
McBride & the Ride songs
Songs written by Terry McBride (musician)
Song recordings produced by Tony Brown (record producer)
MCA Records singles